Chiroda is a village and former petty Rajput princely state in Gujarat, western India.

History 
Chiroda was one of many princely states in Gohelwar prant, under the colonial authority of the Eastern Kathiawar Agency, comprising solely the village and ruled by Sarvaiya Rajput Chieftains.

In 1901, it had a population of 247, yielding a state revenue of 2,500 Rupees (nearly all from land), paying a tribute of 135 Rupees, to the Gaekwar Baroda State and Junagadh State.

External links and sources 
 Imperial Gazetteer - Kathiawar

Princely states of Gujarat
Rajput princely states